Sphaeropsocidae is a family of Psocodea (formerly Psocoptera), belonging to the suborder Troctomorpha. Females of this family have reduced, beetle-like elytra, and lack hindwings, with males have either small or absent wings. The family comprises 22 known species (four of them fossils) in eight genera.

Taxonomy 

 †Asphaeropsocites Azar et al. 2010 Lebanese amber, Early Cretaceous (Barremian)
 Badonnelia Pearman, 1953 Chile, Recent (except Badonnelia titei, which is found alongside humans in Europe and North America)

 Sphaeropsocopsis North America, South America, St Helena, Recent
 Sphaeropsocus Baltic amber, Eocene, Southeastern US (Recent)
 †Sphaeropsocites Lebanese amber, Early Cretaceous (Barremian)
 †Sphaeropsocoides Canadian amber, Late Cretaceous (Campanian)
 Globopsocus
 Prosphaeropsocus California, Recent
 Troglosphaeropsocus Arizona, Recent

References

 Lienhard, C. & Smithers, C. N. 2002. Psocoptera (Insecta): World Catalogue and Bibliography. Instrumenta Biodiversitatis, vol. 5. Museum of Natural History, Geneva, Switzerland.

Psocoptera families
Nanopsocetae